is a Japanese football player. He played as a midfielder, most recently for Mumbai in the Indian I-League.

Career

JEF United Chiba
From 2005 to 2006 Matsugae was a squad player for JEF United Chiba in the J1 League but could not see any playing time during his time at the club.

TDK/Blaublitz Akita
In 2007 Matsugae joined TDK/Blaublitz Akita who played in the Japan Football League. He stayed at the club from 2007 to 2012 in which he played in 150 league matches and scored 20 goals in his time at the club.

Shillong Lajong
On 17 January 2013 it was announced that Matsugae had joined Shillong Lajong F.C. on trial for two weeks. Despite him being only on trial and not signing a contract yet Matsugae made his debut for Shillong Lajong in the I-League on 20 January 2013 coming on as a substitute for Pailan Arrows in which Shillong Lajong lost the match 1–0. On 2 February he scored debut his goal for Shillong Lajong against United Sikkim F.C. in I-League

Mumbai FC
Taisuke will represent Mumbai FC for the 2014–15 I-League

References

External links 
 

1982 births
Living people
Meiji University alumni
Association football people from Kagawa Prefecture
Japanese footballers
J1 League players
Japan Football League players
I-League players
JEF United Chiba players
Blaublitz Akita players
Shillong Lajong FC players
Mumbai FC players
Japanese expatriate sportspeople in India
Expatriate footballers in India
Association football midfielders